Snapdancer (foaled 16 August 2016) is a multiple Group 1 winning Australian Thoroughbred racehorse.

Background

Bred by Coolmore Stud, Snapdancer was sold for A$180,000 at the 2018 Magic Millions yearling sale.  She was purchased by Spicer Thoroughbreds/Darren Weir Racing.

Racing career

Snapdancer did not start in a race until she was a three-year-old when finishing second in a maiden at Pakenham on the 1 August 2019.  She won her first race just three weeks later at the Ballarat race course.

As a five-year-old, Snapdancer was successful in the 2022 Magic Millions for Fillies and Mares, when ridden by James McDonald.

McDonald was the jockey at Snapdancer's next start when winning the Triscay Stakes at Randwick.  This was Snapdancer's first stakes win, despite placing at Listed and Group level on four previous occasions.

Snapdancer won two Group 1 races in 2022 when successful in the Robert Sangster Stakes at Morphettville and the Memsie Stakes at Caulfield, on both occasions ridden by jockey Ethan Brown.

Pedigree

References 

Racehorses bred in Australia
Racehorses trained in Australia
2016 racehorse births